Diospyros inconstans is a species of tree in the family Ebenaceae. It is native to Panama and South America.

References

inconstans
Trees of Peru
Trees of Panama
Trees of Colombia
Trees of Bolivia
Trees of Ecuador
Trees of Brazil
Trees of Venezuela
Trees of Argentina
Trees of Paraguay